The 2007–08 Cypriot Third Division was the 37th season of the Cypriot third-level football league. PAEEK FC won their 3rd title.

Format
Fourteen teams participated in the 2007–08 Cypriot Third Division. All teams played against each other twice, once at their home and once away. The team with the most points at the end of the season crowned champions. The first three teams were promoted to the 2008–09 Cypriot Second Division and the last three teams were relegated to the 2008–09 Cypriot Fourth Division.

Point system
Teams received three points for a win, one point for a draw and zero points for a loss.

Changes from previous season
Teams promoted to 2007–08 Cypriot Second Division
 Ermis Aradippou
 Atromitos Yeroskipou
 Olympos Xylofagou

Teams relegated from 2006–07 Cypriot Second Division
 Chalkanoras Idaliou
 Iraklis Gerolakkou
 AEM Mesogis1

1AEM Mesogis merged with Kissos Kissonergas forming Kissos Kissonergas, which took the place of AEM Mesogis in the Cypriot Third Division.

Teams promoted from 2006–07 Cypriot Fourth Division
 Spartakos Kitiou
 AEK Kouklia
 Anagennisi Trachoniou

Teams relegated to 2007–08 Cypriot Fourth Division
 Digenis Oroklinis
 FC Episkopi
 SEK Agiou Athanasiou

League standings

Results

See also
 Cypriot Third Division
 2007–08 Cypriot First Division
 2007–08 Cypriot Cup

Sources

Cypriot Third Division seasons
Cyprus
2007–08 in Cypriot football